Lame Ducks is a British television sitcom made by the BBC in 1984 and written by Peter J. Hammond.

The series starred John Duttine as Brian Drake, a man who, no longer able to work due to a serious injury after being hit by a truck, decides to head off to live as a hermit. As he goes along, he is joined by various other outcasts, including a woman called Angie (played by Lorraine Chase). The group eventually settle at a derelict railway station.

Later, a private detective called Ansell (played by Brian Murphy), hired by Drake's wife (Primi Townsend), locates the group, but, as an outcast himself, decides to join them.

Cast

John Duttine as Brian Drake
Lorraine Chase as Angie
Brian Murphy as Ansell
Patric Turner as Tommy
Tony Millan as Maurice
Cyd Hayman as Mrs. Kelly
Primi Townsend as Mrs. Drake (Series 1)
Giles Cole as Ray
Edward Highmore as Freddie

External links
 

BBC television sitcoms
1980s British sitcoms
1984 British television series debuts
1985 British television series endings
English-language television shows